Cisthene hilaris is a moth of the family Erebidae. It was described by Felder in 1875. It is found in Venezuela.

References

Cisthenina
Moths described in 1875